The 2007–08 season in Danish 2nd Division was divided in two groups. The two winners were promoted to the 2008–09 Danish 1st Division, together with the winner of a promotion game between the two runners-up. Second squad teams can not promote, or play in the promotion game.

Participants

East group

West group

Promotion game
The two runners-up will play promotion game on home and away basis.

First leg

Second leg

External links
Table and results at Danish FA:
East group
West group
Promotion game

Danish 2nd Division seasons
3
Danish